Xestocasis erymnota is a moth in the family Oecophoridae. It was described by Edward Meyrick in 1917 and is found in the Philippines.

References

Oecophorinae